The Golden Bull of 1222 was a golden bull, or edict, issued by Andrew II of Hungary. King Andrew II was forced by his nobles to accept the Golden Bull (Aranybulla), which was one of the first examples of constitutional limits being placed on the powers of a European monarch.  The Golden Bull was issued at the year 1222 diet of Fehérvár. The law established the rights of the Hungarian nobility, including the right to disobey the King when he acted contrary to law (jus resistendi). The nobles and the church were freed from all taxes and could not be forced to go to war outside of Hungary and were not obligated to finance it. This was also a historically important document because it set down the principles of equality for all of the nation's nobility. Seven copies of the edict were created, one for each of the following institutions: to the Pope, to the Knights Templar, to the Knights Hospitaller, to the Hungarian king itself, to the chapters of Esztergom and Kalocsa and to the palatine.

The charter's creation was influenced by the emergence of a nobility middle class, unusual in the nation's feudal system. As a regular gesture of generosity, King Andrew often donated property to particularly faithful servants, who thereafter gained new economic and class power. With the nation's class system and economic state changing, King Andrew found himself coerced into decreeing the Golden Bull of 1222 to relax tensions between hereditary nobles and the budding middle class nobility.

The Golden Bull is often compared to Magna Carta; the Bull was the first constitutional document of the nation of Hungary, while Magna Carta was the first constitutional charter of the nation of England.

Background

Grants of liberties 

The Golden Bull that Andrew II of Hungary issued in the spring of 1222 is "one of a number of charters published in thirteenth-century Christendom that sought to constrain the royal power." Peter II of Aragon had already in 1205 planned to make concessions to his subjects. Simon de Montfort, supreme commander of the Albigensian Crusade, issued the Statute of Pamiers in 1212, confirming the privileges of the clergymen and limiting the authority of the future rulers of Toulouse and Carcassonne. The statute influenced the Magna Carta of John, King of England, which also secured the liberties of the Church and regulated feudal relationships in 1215. The Holy Roman Emperor, Frederick II, strengthened the authority of the imperial prelates in 1220.

Contacts between Hungary and these countries can be demonstrated during this period. Aragonese nobles settled in Hungary in the early 13th century. Hungarian participants of the Fifth Crusade could meet Robert Fitzwalter and other leaders of the movement which had achieved the issue of the Magna Carta. Two Hungarian prelates visited Canterbury in 1220. However, no direct connection between the texts of the Golden Bull and other early 13th-century grants of liberties can be demonstrated. Historian James Clarke Holt says, there is no need to assume that the authors of these documents borrowed from each other, because all these charters embodied the "natural reaction of feudal societies to monarchical importunity".

Hungarian society 

The existence of at least a dozen distinct social groups can be documented in Hungary in the 12th and 13th centuries. Freemen and serfs were the two fundamental categories, but intermediate "semi-free" groups also existed. Freemen could  in theory freely choose their lords, but they were in practice required to remain loyal to their masters. On the other hand, unfree warriors could hold large estates but could face legal arbitrary actions of royal officials.

The highest-ranking royal officials were appointed from among men who regarded themselves the descendants of either the Hungarian chieftains of the period of the establishment of the kingdom or of the foreign warriors who settled in Hungary during the subsequent centuries. They were mentioned as "noblemen" from the end of the 12th century, but they did not form a hereditary elite. The most prominent families started to name themselves after their forefathers in the 1200s, but their genealogies were often fabricated. The Gesta Hungarorum, which was completed around 1200, emphasized that the ancestors of many noblemen played a preeminent role in the Hungarian Conquest of the Carpathian Basin.

Initially, each freeman was required to serve in the royal army. Those who were unable to perform this duty were obliged to pay taxes in the 12th century. The majority of the castle warriors were unfree, but freemen could also choose to serve the ispáns (or heads) of the royal castles. They were to defend the royal castles and accompany the monarchs to their military campaigns in exchange for the parcels they held in royal lands around the castles. Free castle warriors could also retain their own estates. The highest ranking castle warriors started to refer to themselves as "freemen" or "warriors of the holy kings" to emphasize their privileged status.

Thousands of foreignersSlavs, Germans, Italians and Walloonscame to Hungary to populate the sparsely inhabited lands or to work in the centers of royal administration. These "guests" preserved their personal freedom even if they settled in the estates of the aristocrats or churchmen. Jews could legally settle only in the centers of the bishoprics, but they actually also lived in other towns. They were primarily merchants, engaged in long-distance trade. Muslims and christians who settled in Hungary were employed in the administration of royal revenues, but the presence of Muslim warriors is also documented.

Transformation 

Béla III of Hungary, who ruled from 1172 to 1196, was one of the wealthiest European monarchs of his time, according to a summary of his revenues. He earned income from the periodical exchange of coins, royal salt monopoly and customs duties, but significant part of his revenues came from the royal estates, because he owned more than half of landed property in the kingdom. He decreed that each transaction proceeding in his presence was to be recorded, which gave rise to the development of the royal chancellery. Thereafter private transactions were also frequently recorded and preserved at specific monasteries or cathedral chapters, known as "places of authentication".

Béla III's eldest son and successor, Emeric, faced a series of rebellions initiated by his younger brother, Andrew. Both the king and his brother, who seized Croatia and Dalmatia, made generous grants to their partisans to secure their loyalty. Prelates and high-ranking officials supported Andrew against the king, but Emeric defeated his brother. Andrew mounted the throne after the sudden death of Emeric's infant son, Ladislaus III, in 1205.

Andrew appointed his former supporters to the highest offices, but most of his brother's former officials could retain their offices, because he needed their assistance. For instance, four of Andrew's first seven palatinesCsépán Győr and his brother, Pat, Julius Kán and Bánk Bár-Kalánhad held offices already during Emeric's reign. The ispáns of Bács, Sopron, Zala and other important counties were mostly nominated from among Emeric's former supporters. The heads of the royal householdincluding the master of the horse and the master of the stewardsbecame the members of the royal council during Andrew's reign. He always appointed one of his old partisans to these new offices.

Andrew started to grant large areas of royal estates and significant sums of money to his former supporters. For instance, Alexander of the Hont-Pázmány clan, who had helped Andrew to flee from his brother's prison, received 300 marks in 1217. Andrew's predecessors had also donated royal estates in perpetuity, but mostly those situated in the borderlands. Breaking with this practise, Andrew gave away large domains which were located in the central regions. The new policy of donations, known as novae institutiones ("new arrangements"), significantly reduced the revenues of the ispáns of the counties, because one third of all royal revenues from their counties were due to them. The "new arrangements" also diminished royal revenues. Andrew introduced new taxes and ordered the exchange of coins twice a year to secure the funds to the maintenance of his royal court. He farmed out the collection of the taxes and the administration of the royal mint to Jews and Muslims.

According to a widespread scholarly theory, the appearance of wealthy landowners in the counties threatened the social position of both the free and unfree royal warriors. Lesser landowners started to emphasize their direct link to the monarch. According to the available sources, landowners from Hosszúhetény were the first to call themselves "freemen and royal servants" during a court case against the abbot of Pécsvárad Abbey in 1212. Andrew started to grant the same status from the 1210s. Royal servants were to serve in the royal army, but independently of the ispáns who were the commanders of the county troops.

Andrew's "new arrangements" stirred up discontent among his subjects. A group of dignitaries made attempts to dethrone him in favor of his cousins in 1209. His wife, Gertrude of Merania, who had persuaded him to make generous grants to her German relatives and courtiers, was assassinated in 1213. He was forced to have his eight-year-old son, Béla, crowned king in 1214. After he left for a crusade to the Holy Land in 1217, his deputy, John, Archbishop of Esztergom, was expelled from Hungary. Andrew returned to Hungary in 1218. Shortly thereafter, his chancellery issued a series of charters which were dated as if he had started to reign in the spring of 1204, thus ignoring the last months of his brother's reign and the entire period of his nephew's rule. According to historian Attila Zsoldos, Andrew wanted to invalidate the royal charters which were issued during the eighteen months before his actual ascension to the throne.

The royal council ordered the revision of the grants concerning the estates of the udvornici (or semi-free peasants) in 1220. Next year, a similar decision was passed about the estates of the castle folk. Andrew was forced to appoint Béla to administer the lands beyond the Drava River in 1220. The noblemen who had lost Andrew's favor assembled in his son's new court.

1222 movement 

The circumstances of the promulgation of the Golden Bull are uncertain because of the lack of sources. The Golden Bull itself is the principal source of the events which forced Andrew to issue it. Royal charters and Pope Honorius III's letters to Hungarian dignitaries provide further information about the political history of the year.

On 4 July 1222, the pope urged the Hungarian prelates to apply ecclesiastical censures against those who had claimed that they did not owe loyalty to Andrew, but to Béla.

The available data suggest that discontented noblemen, many of whom had held high offices during Emeric's reign, staged a coup in the spring of 1222.

The Golden Bull was drafted by Cletus Bél, royal chancellor and provost of Eger.

Main points of the Bull

Royal servants' rights 

More than one third of the articles of the Golden Bull dealt with the grievances of the royal servants. The king promised that  the collecta (an extraordinary tax) may collect tax on their estates whereas freemen's pennies (an ordinary tax) may not be collected on their estates. He also pledged that they may accommodate him and his officials. Royal servants who had no sons were granted the right of exchange of their estates in their testaments in return to receive a sum of money and benefits. The Golden Bull limited the judicial power of the ispáns, stating that  in the royal servants' estates they could administer justice only in cases concerning the tithe and coinage. Royal servants were exempted of the obligation of accompanying the monarch to military expeditions to foreign lands.

See also
Hungarian Diet

References

Sources

Primary sources 

Master Roger's Epistle to the Sorrowful Lament upon the Destruction of the Kingdom of Hungary by the Tatars (Translated and Annotated by János M. Bak and Martyn Rady) (2010). In Rady, Martyn; Veszprémy, László; Bak, János M. (2010). Anonymus and Master Roger. CEU Press. .
The Laws of the Medieval Kingdom of Hungary, 1000–1301 (Translated and Edited by János M. Bak, György Bónis, James Ross Sweeney with an essay on previous editions by Andor Csizmadia, Second revised edition, In collaboration with Leslie S. Domonkos) (1999). Charles Schlacks, Jr. Publishers. pp. 1–11. .

Secondary sources

External links 
 The Full Text of the Laws 
  Martyn Rady, 'Hungary and the Golden Bull of 1222'
The full text of the Golden Bull [version  from 1318, the earliest copy what remained]: Endre kiraly Aranybullája. [Golden Bull of king Andreas II.] In: Corpus Iuris Hungarici-Magyar Törvénytár. Budapest, 1899. Franklin társulat. (in Latin and Hungarian) 130-145 p (248-264)https://archive.org/details/magyartrvnytrco01hunggoog/page/n441/mode/2up?q=Aranybulla

Legal history of Hungary
1220s in law
1222 in Europe
Golden Bulls
13th century in Hungary
13th-century documents
Medieval legal texts
Medieval charters and cartularies of Hungary